Luo Jin (born November 30, 1981)  is a Chinese actor and singer.  He graduated from Beijing Film Academy in 2006.

Early life and Career
Luo was born on November 30, 1981 in Tonggu County, Yichun, Jiangxi. He made his acting debut in the 2003 drama  The Showroom Tales. In 2007, Luo starred in the film Fujian Blue (2007) which won the Dragons and Tigers Award and the 2007 Vancouver International Film Festival.

2010 was considered Luo's breakout year. He first gained attention for his portrayal of Emperor Xian of Han in the acclaimed historical drama Three Kingdoms (2010), directed by Gao Xixi. Thereafter, his popularity increased after starring in palace drama Beauty's Rival in Palace (2010),  where he played a Han-dynasty Emperor who sacrificed himself for love. The same year, he starred in the Mexican-Spanish film Biutiful, portraying a gay couple with Javier Bardem.
The film was invited to the Cannes Film Festival.

This was followed up with starring roles in dramas such as war drama Far Away the Eagle (2011), historical dramas Mui Guiying Takes Command (2012), and Beauties of the Emperor (2012), and spy drama Agent X (2013); which showcased his acting versatility and helped raise his recognition in China. In 2014, he won the Most Popular Actor award at the China Student Television Festival for his performance in the war drama Ten Rides of Red Army.

Luo successfully broke into the mainstream with his performance in the television series Diamond Lover (2015) and The Princess Weiyoung (2016), both co-starring Tiffany Tang. Luo also has supporting roles in the biopic film Xuan Zang (2016) and fantasy romance film  Once Upon a Time (2017); which led to him winning the Most Anticipated Actor at the Weibo Movie Awards Ceremony.

Following a two-year hiatus, Luo made his small screen comeback in 2017 with crime drama Love's Lies, followed by romance dramas The Way We Were and My Story for You.

In 2019, Luo starred in the workplace drama Behind The Scenes as a television producer; and played the role of Yang Jian in fantasy drama The Gods. The same year, Luo starred in the historical political drama Royal Nirvana. 
Luo ranked 48th on Forbes China Celebrity 100 list.

In 2020, Luo starred in the workplace slice-of-life drama I Will Find You a Better Home as a genius analyst who became a manager of a real estate office. He ranked 50th on Forbes China Celebrity 100 list.

Personal life
On 6 December 2016, Luo confirmed his relationship with actress Tiffany Tang. In October 2018, Luo and Tang were married in Vienna, Austria. In September 2019, they announced that they were expecting their first child together. In December 2019 she had given birth to a baby girl.

Filmography

Film

Television series

Discography

Singles

Awards and nominations

References

1981 births
Living people
Male actors from Jiangxi
Beijing Film Academy alumni
Chinese male stage actors
People from Yichun, Jiangxi
Singers from Jiangxi
Chinese male television actors
Chinese male film actors
21st-century Chinese male actors
21st-century Chinese male singers